Shattered Peace is one in a series of OEL manga in the novel series Warriors. The book was published by Tokyopop and released on 24 November 2009. It follows the story of two cats who are thrown out of their home by a group of hostile cats. It is illustrated by James L. Barry.

Plot
The comic begins with Ravenpaw waking up on the farm with his friend, Barley. He goes about his day, narrating his thoughts about the farm and his life.

At night, the duo hears a scratching noise outside the barn door. They open it to see a group of cats standing there: Willie, Minty, Snapper, Tess and Pounce. Minty, Willie's mate, is about to have kits, so they plead to come in. Ravenpaw welcomes them kindly, and catches prey for them. Soon, the kits are born, and they are named Snowflake, Icicle, Cloudy and Sniff. Ravenpaw becomes very fond of them. The newcomers continue to impose on Ravenpaw and Barley's hospitality, insisting the both of them hunt for them. Barley doesn't like it, but Ravenpaw happily helps them.

One day, Barley catches Snapper teaching the kits death blows. He tells Ravenpaw about it, but Ravenpaw that it's nothing but nonsense, and they need to protect those precious kits. Barley is offput and upset. Later, Barley overhears Willie and Snapper talking about getting their own territory, and is suspicious, but doesn't say a word about it to Ravenpaw.

When Willie's gang is ready to leave, Ravenpaw is very sad and is reluctant to see them go, but Barley is relieved and ushers them out. When Ravenpaw and Barley discuss the cats, Ravenpaw accuses Barley of treating the cats like they were intruders. Barley tells Ravenpaw that since his background was with the Clan, that's why he enjoyed their company so much. He also questions Ravenpaw's belonging in the barn, which shocks and offends Ravenpaw.

Ravenpaw goes to sleep while Barley goes off to hunt, both angry at each other. However, a wire in the barn sparks, and soon enough the whole barn catches fire. Barley wakes Ravenpaw up, and gets him out of the barn. The two cats then choose to help the dogs of the humans who own the farm escape the fire as well.

Ravenpaw and Barley sleep outside of the barn because of how destroyed it was. On a hunting expedition the next day, Barley finds a dead rabbit that neither Ravenpaw nor Barley killed. That night, Ravenpaw and Barley hear noises coming from the chicken coop. The noises turn out to be Willie and his gang. Ravenpaw greets them warmly. But, Willie's cats begin to attack the chickens. Ravenpaw and Barley try to stop them, but the others escape. The farmer, hearing the racket, comes to check on his chickens and sees them dead, with the only cats in sight being Ravenpaw and Barley. The farmer thinks Ravenpaw and Barley killed the chickens, and chases them out. They meet Willie and his gang again, off the farm's property, and find out they were former members of BloodClan, trying to remake their "lost" Clan. Ravenpaw and Barley begin to fight with Willie's gang, but Minty calls for them to stop, saying that enough blood has been shed and that Ravenpaw and Barley should just leave and never return.

That night, the duo sleeps under a bush in the rain, and Ravenpaw apologizes to Barley for not listening to him. The next morning, Ravenpaw sees Highstones from the distance and decides to go there. The two cats spend the night there, and while there, Ravenpaw speaks to StarClan in a dream. Bluestar, Whitestorm and Spottedleaf visit him, and say that they've seen his and Barley's troubles. They tell him to go to Firestar, leader of ThunderClan, and ask for help. Ravenpaw wakes up, and he and Barley leave on their way to ThunderClan.

Critical reception 
"Since this is the first "Warriors" book I have read, I was pleased to find that the author includes enough information before the first chapter that I could understand what was happening from the start. In this addition to the series, Ravenpaw decides to leave the security of his association with the ThunderClan and move to the farm. There, he lives with his friend Barley, enjoying the kind of peaceful life a cat is suppose to have. He enjoys the calm nights, hearing the rooster, and the safe feeling he has all the time. Then, one day, a group of cats arrive and ask to stay with them for a few days. After they leave, they return with bad intentions. Ravenpaw must draw on his past to defend his home, his friend, and himself. Books written in graphic format are favorites of mine! They are perfect for students who are reluctant readers and never seem to finish a book on their own. Young adults who want to read anything they can get their hands on also will enjoy the graphics, the exhilarating story, and the fast-paced text. The story is suitable for both boys and girls, and it is a good choice for children who like adventure stories and animal tales. The wonderful artwork adds much to the story. It is a fun read with a story that moves quickly and smoothly." — Kathie M. Josephs

Publication list 
 Shattered Peace (EN), HarperCollins (paperback), 24 November 2009
 Rabenpfotes Abenteuer (DE), Tokyopop (paperback), June 2011
 Потревоженный покой (RU), OLMA Media Group (paperback), 2012
 Knust idyll (NO), Juritzen Jr. (unknown binding), 15 June 2018
 Shattered Peace (EN), HarperCollins (paperback; colored reprint), 26 June 2018

References

2009 American novels
American fantasy novels
Warriors (novel series)
HarperCollins books
2009 children's books
Comics about cats
Original English-language manga